Colletes latitarsis, the broad-footed cellophane bee, is a species of cellophane or plasterer, masked, and fork-tongued bees in the family Colletidae. It is found in North America.

References

Further reading

External links

 

Colletidae
Articles created by Qbugbot
Insects described in 1891